Kennedy Scholarships provide full funding for up to ten British post-graduate students to study at either Harvard University or the Massachusetts Institute of Technology (MIT). Susan Hockfield, the sixteenth president of MIT, described the scholarship program as a way to "offer exceptional students unique opportunities to broaden their intellectual and personal horizons, in ways that are more important than ever in an era defined by global interaction.". In 2007, 163 applications were received, of which 10 were ultimately selected, for an acceptance rate of 6.1%.

The creation of the Kennedy Memorial Trust
Following the assassination of President John F. Kennedy in 1963, Sir Alec Douglas-Home, the Prime Minister of the United Kingdom, set about creating a national British memorial in his memory. He consulted with Harold Wilson (the Leader of HM's Loyal Opposition), Sir David Ormsby-Gore (British Ambassador to the United States), Dean Rusk (United States Secretary of State) and the Kennedy family. It was agreed that Douglas-Home would establish a committee, chaired by Lord Franks (former British Ambassador to the United States of America), to make recommendations on the form of the memorial to President Kennedy.

Following wide consultation, Franks wrote to the Prime Minister to recommend that the memorial should be in two parts: a living memorial, in the form of a scholarship to attend either Harvard or MIT, and a permanent memorial site in Runnymede, England, the site of the Magna Carta. This location was chosen because it was regarded as the birthplace of the freedoms which President Kennedy promised to uphold. The John F. Kennedy Memorial Act 1964 was passed into legislation to enact and manage the two memorials.

Kennedy family

The Kennedy family have been strong supporters of the British Kennedy memorial since its creation. Prior to the United States' entry into the Second World War, Joseph P. Kennedy Sr. served as the United States Ambassador to the United Kingdom. In 1965, Jacqueline Kennedy and Elizabeth II of the United Kingdom unveiled the memorial at Runnymede. It consists of a Portland stone memorial tablet within natural woodland and meadow, where the visitor is invited on a journey, resembling that in Pilgrim's Progress; the journey through what is seen is mirrored by a deeper one into the unseen landscape of life, death and spirit. The stone is inscribed with the famous quote from Kennedy's Inaugural Address given on 20 January 1961:

Senator Edward Kennedy described the program as the most ambitious of all the memorials to his brother, and he was a passionate supporter of the Kennedy Scholarships until his death in August 2009.

Former trustees
Since 1964, all UK Kennedy Memorial Trust trustees have been appointed by the Prime Minister of the United Kingdom. Various prominent individuals have previously served as trustees. These include: 
Professor Sir Isaiah Berlin OM FBA – philosopher, president of the British Academy (1974–1978)
Professor Sir David Cannadine FBA – Dodge Professor of History, Princeton University and visiting professor of history, Oxford University (2000–2010)
Professor Peter Hennessy, Baron Hennessy of Nympsfield FBA – (chairman 1995–2000)
Professor Tony Badger (chairman) – former master of Clare College, Cambridge and Paul Mellon Professor of American History, Cambridge University (chairman 2010–2015)
Mervyn King, Lord King of Lothbury – former Governor of the Bank of England (1990–2000)
Professor Jack Lewis, Baron Lewis of Newnham (1989–1999)
Roger Makins, 1st Baron Sherfield GCB GCMG FRS – (first chairman)
Professor Roderick MacFarquhar – Leroy B Williams Professor of History and Political Science, Harvard University. (2000–2010)
David Ormsby-Gore, 5th Baron Harlech  PC – (chairman 1964–1985)
Professor Anthony Quinton, Baron Quinton – (chairman 1990–1995), former Master of Trinity College, Oxford 
Professor Martin Rees, Baron Rees of Ludlow – Master of Trinity College, Cambridge (1999–2004)
Andrew Stuart Winckler (1998–2003)
Professor Emma Rothschild – (chairman 2000–2009), honorary professor of history and economics University of Cambridge, director of the Center for History and Economics and professor of history, Harvard University
Robin Russell, 14th Duke of Bedford – (chairman 1985–1990)
Jonathan Glover – professor of philosophy at New College, Oxford
Johnny Grimond – editor at large The Economist.
Professor Anthony Saich (representing Harvard) – director of the Ash Centre for Democratic Governance and Innovation, Daewoo Professor of International Affairs, Harvard Kennedy School
Dr Martin Weale CBE, Monetary Policy Committee, Bank of England

Trustees
The current trustees are:
Professor Sir Mark Walport (chairman) – former CEO of UKRI and former director of the Wellcome Trust.
United States Ambassador to the United Kingdom –  (representing the President of the United States).
Matt Clifford MBE – former Kennedy Scholar, co-founder and CEO of Entrepreneur First
Dr Peter Englander OBE – former Kennedy Scholar, venture capitalist.
Stephanie Flanders – former Kennedy Scholar, head of Bloomberg Economics.
Tilly Franklin – former Kennedy Scholar, chief investment officer of University of Cambridge Endowment Fund
Professor Maya Jasanoff (representing Harvard) – X.D. and Nancy Yang Professor, Coolidge Professor of History, and Harvard College Professor, Harvard University
Professor Fiona Macpherson – former Kennedy Scholar, head of philosophy and director of the Centre for the Study of Perceptual Experience, Glasgow University.
Mary Ann Sieghart – journalist and author
Moira Wallace OBE – former Kennedy Scholar, former civil servant and provost of Oriel College, University of Oxford 
Professor Andrew Whittle (representing MIT) – former Kennedy Scholar, Edmund K. Turner Professor in Civil Engineering, MIT

Patrons
The Lord Mayor of London
The Governor of the Bank of England

Selection
More than 550 individuals have been awarded a Kennedy Scholarship. Selection follows a national competition which begins each autumn. A long-list and short-list are chosen and then around twenty-five individuals are invited to London for interview by the trustees.

When evaluating applications and interviewing candidates, the trustees take into consideration candidates':
 intellectual attainment
 readiness and ability to express themselves
 the suitability of their proposed course of study at Harvard or MIT.

They may also look for: originality of mind, commitment to public service, potential to make a mark in public life and the ability to overcome adversity

The selection aims, criteria and standards are comparable to the Rhodes Scholarship program.

Notable Kennedy scholars
Prominent former scholars include:

Politics, government and civil service

 

Ed Balls – politician – Shadow Chancellor of the Exchequer (2011–2015), Secretary of State for Children, Schools and Families (2007–2010)
Dame Kate Bingham – former head of UK Government's COVID-19 Vaccine Task Force
Nicholas Boles – Parliamentary Under-Secretary of State, Department for Communities and Local Government (2012–), Chief of Staff to the London Mayor Boris Johnson (2008), director of the Policy Exchange (2002–2007)
Camilla Cavendish – former journalist and leader writer, The Times, The Sunday Times; sometime head of Number 10 Policy Unit, now Baroness Cavendish of Little Venice
Yvette Cooper – politician – Shadow Home Secretary (2011–2015), Secretary of State for Work and Pensions (2009–2010), Chief Secretary to the Treasury (2008–2009)
David Curry – politician – shadow Secretary of State for Environment, Food and Rural Affairs (2003–2004), Minister for Local Government, Housing and Urban Regeneration (1994–1997)
 Sir Alan Duncan – politician – Minister of State for Foreign Affairs (2016– ), Minister of State for Department for International Development (2010–2015), shadow Leader of the House of Commons (2009), shadow Secretary of State for Business, Enterprise and Regulatory Reform (2005–2009),
Barry Gardiner – politician – Parliamentary Under Secretary of State at the Northern Ireland Office (2004–2005), Department of Trade and Industry (2005–2006) and DEFRA (2006–2007)
Duncan Hamilton (politician) – politician, now advocate – Member of the Scottish Parliament for Highlands and Islands region (1999–2003), youngest member of the Scottish Parliament, special advisor to Alex Salmond, First Minister of Scotland (2007–2008)
Kwasi Kwarteng – politician – Chancellor of the Exchequer (2022–2022) and Member of Parliament for Spelthorne (2010–)
Gordon Marsden – politician – Parliamentary Private Secretary to Lord Chancellor's Department (2001–2003) and to Secretary of State for Culture, Media and Sport (2003–2005)
Ian Martin – United Nations special representative of the secretary-general in Nepal, secretary-general of Amnesty International (1986–1992)
Mahiben Maruthappu – Health policy specialist, former advisor to National Health Service
David Miliband – politician – president International Rescue Committee (2013–), Secretary of State for Foreign and Commonwealth Affairs (2007–2010)

Chris Smith, Baron Smith of Finsbury – politician, now Master of Pembroke College, Cambridge – chairman of the Environment Agency (2008–2014), Secretary of State for Culture, Media and Sport (1997–2001)
Una O'Brien – Permanent Secretary, Department of Health (United Kingdom)
Richard Tomlinson – former MI6 officer, author of the Big Breach: From Top Secret to Maximum Security.
William Arthur Waldegrave, Baron Waldegrave of North Hill – politician – Secretary of State for Health (1990–1992), Chancellor of the Duchy of Lancaster (1992–1994), Minister of Agriculture, Fisheries and Food (1994–1995), Chief Secretary to the Treasury (1995–1997). Former chairman of the Rhodes Scholarship program. Provost of Eton College.
Moira Wallace – Provost Oriel College, Oxford University (2013–), Permanent Secretary, Department of Energy and Climate Change (2008–2012)
 Peter Wilson CMG – diplomat – UK Ambassador & Deputy Permanent Representative for the UK Mission to the UN (2014–) 
Anthony Wayland Wright – politician – chairman of the Public Administration Select Committee (1999–2010)

Economics and finance
Ros Altmann – economist, Baroness Altmann CBE, Ministor for Pensions (2015–), former member of Number 10 Policy Unit
Linda Todhunter Bilheimer – economist, assistant director, US Congressional Budget Office 
Lord Eatwell – economist, president of Queens' College, Cambridge University
Peter Englander – former director of Apax Partners, and former CEO of the Apax Foundation.
Sylvia Ann Hewlett – economist, founding president of the Center for Work-Life Policy
Charlotte Hogg – economist, chief operating officer, Bank of England (2013–)
Mervyn King, Prof the Lord King of Lothbury KG GCB FBA – former Governor of the Bank of England (2003–2013)
Emma Rothschild – economic historian
Tim Sims – founder and managing director of Pacific Equity Partners

Journalism

Stephanie Flanders – former economics editor, BBC
Zanny Minton Beddoes – editor-in-chief, The Economist
Simon Kuper – journalist and author, the Financial Times
Anatole Kaletsky – author and columnist, Reuters chairman, Institute for New Economic Thinking
Catherine Sampson – journalist and author

Arts

Hannah Sullivan – poet

Academia
Andrew Blake FREng, FRS –  director of Alan Turing Institute, former principal research scientist at Microsoft Research Cambridge
Jon Blundy FRS – professor of petrology, Earth Sciences Department, Bristol University
Professor John Craven CBE – former vice-chancellor of the University of Portsmouth, founder and first chairman of the University Alliance
Sally Connolly – associate professor of contemporary poetry, University of Houston
Gareth Evans – philosopher
David Edwards FMedSci (neuroscientist) – professor of paediatrics and neonatal medicine and director of the Centre for the Developing Brain, King's College London.
Mark Ford – professor in English, University College London
Jill Harries – professor emerita of ancient history at the University of St Andrews
David Held – professor at School of Government and Master, University College, Durham University; co-founder of Polity Press.
Peter Hennessy – historian, Professor the Lord Hennessy of Nympsfield FBA, Attlee Professor of Contemporary British History at Queen Mary, University of London and crossbencher, House of Lords. 
Simon Goldhill – classicist, professor of Greek literature and culture at the University of Cambridge and fellow of King's College, Cambridge
Neil F. Johnson – physicist, professor of physics at the University of Miami, Florida
Richard K. Lester – Japan Steel Industry Professor of Nuclear Engineering at MIT and associate provost for international activities.
Dominic Lieven FBA – professor; senior research fellow, Trinity College, Cambridge.
Peter Littlewood FRS – physicist, professor; laboratory director for physical sciences and engineering, Argonne National Laboratory, Illinois
Rana Mitter – professor of history and politics of modern China, Oxford University
Christopher Peacocke FBA – philosopher, professor of philosophy at Columbia University
Tony Purnell – engineer, head of technology, British Cycling; fellow-commoner in engineering, Trinity Hall, Cambridge
Simon Schaffer – professor of the history and philosophy of science, Cambridge University
Chloë Starr – professor of Asian theology and Christianity, Yale Divinity School
Tom F. Wright FRHistS – historian - Reader in Rhetoric at University of Sussex

Law
Mary Arden, the Rt Hon. Lady Arden of Heswall DBE – Justice of the Supreme Court of the United Kingdom, chairman of the Law Commission (1996–1999)
Nicholas Hamblen, The Rt Hon. Lord Hamblen of Kersey – Justice of the Supreme Court of the United Kingdom
Sir Bernard Rix QC, Arbitrator and former Lord Justice of Appeal

See also
 List of buildings and monuments honoring presidents of the United States in other countries

References

External links
 Kennedy Memorial Trust website

Monuments and memorials in England
Memorial Trust
Harvard University
Massachusetts Institute of Technology
Scholarships in the United Kingdom
Scholarships in the United States
Charities based in London
Memorials to John F. Kennedy
Buildings and monuments honouring American presidents in the United Kingdom